Second contact may refer to:
Second contact, an event that occurs during an astronomical transit
"Second Contact", a 2020 episode of Star Trek: Lower Decks
Fire Hawk: Thexder - The Second Contact, 1989 video game
Colonization: Second Contact, 1999 Harry Turtledove novel